The UK Singles Chart is one of many music charts compiled by the Official Charts Company that calculates the best-selling singles of the week in the United Kingdom. Since 2004 the chart has been based on the sales of both physical singles and digital downloads, with airplay figures excluded from the official chart. This list shows singles that peaked in the Top 10 of the UK Singles Chart during 2012, as well as singles which peaked in 2011 and 2013 but were in the top 10 in 2012. The entry date is when the song appeared in the top 10 for the first time (week ending, as published by the Official Charts Company, which is six days after the chart is announced).

One-hundred and forty-four singles were in the top ten in 2012. Eleven singles from 2011 remained in the top 10 for several weeks at the beginning of the year, while "Scream & Shout" by will.i.am & Britney Spears and "I Knew You Were Trouble" by Taylor Swift were released in 2012 but did not reach their peak until 2013. "Good Feeling" by Flo Rida and "Paradise" by Coldplay were the singles from 2011 to reach their peak in 2012. Forty-six artists scored multiple entries in the top 10 in 2012.

The first number-one single of the year was "Paradise" by Coldplay. Overall, thirty-six different singles peaked at number-one in 2012, with Rita Ora (3) having the most singles hit that position.

Background

Multiple entries
One-hundred and forty-four singles charted in the top 10 in 2012, with one-hundred and thirty-three singles reaching their peak this year.

Forty-six artists scored multiple entries in the top 10 in 2012. American rapper Flo Rida and Barbadian singer Rihanna shared the highest number of top ten singles in 2012 with five. Flo Rida recorded one solo single which reached the top spot – "Good Feeling" - and also featured on Olly Murs number-one single "Troublemaker". His other top ten entries were "Wild Ones" featuring Sia (number 4), "Whistle" (2) and "I Cry" (3). Rihanna had number-ones with "We Found Love" featuring Calvin Harris (released in 2011) and "Diamonds", and also charted in 2012 with "Where Have You Been" (6), "Stay" featuring Mikky Ekko (4) and a guest appearance on Coldplay's "Princess of China", which reached number four. Scottish DJ Calvin Harris, singers Emeli Sande and Rita Ora, will.i.am from the Black Eyed Peas and French DJ David Guetta all had four top ten singles in 2012.

Chart debuts
Thirty-nine artists achieved their first top 10 single in 2012, either as a lead or featured artist. Of these, four went on to record another hit single that year: Carly Rae Jepsen, Fun, Paloma Faith and Stooshe. Two artists scored two more top 10 singles: Conor Maynard and Lawson. Rita Ora had three other entries in her breakthrough year.

The following table (collapsed) does not include acts who had previously charted as part of a group and secured their first top 10 solo single.

Songs from films
Original songs from various films entered the top 10 throughout the year. These included "Ill Manors" (from Ill Manors) and "Wide Awake" (Katy Perry: Part of Me).

Charity singles
A number of singles recorded for charity reached the top 10 in the charts in 2012. The Sport Relief single was "Proud", recorded by former X Factor finalists JLS, peaking at number six on 31 March 2012.

Girls Aloud recorded the Children in Need single for 2012, entitled "Something New". It was the 21st top ten single of their career out of their twenty-two singles, a run only broken by previous release "Untouchable" (which reached number 11), peaking at number two on 1 December 2012.

A group of artists under the banner Justice Collective produced a cover of "He Ain't Heavy, He's My Brother" (originally by The Hollies) to raise money for charities connected to the Hillsborough Disaster. It became the Christmas number one for that year, replacing James Arthur at the top spot on 29 December 2012.

Best-selling singles
Gotye featuring Kimbra had the best-selling single of the year with "Somebody That I Used to Know". The song spent eighteen weeks in the top 10 (including five weeks at number one), sold over 1.318 million copies and was certified 2× platinum by the BPI (July 2013). "Call Me Maybe" by Carly Rae Jepsen came in second place, selling more than 1.142 million copies and losing out by around 176,000 sales. Fun featuring Janelle Monáe's "We Are Young, "Titanium" from David Guetta featuring Sia and "Impossible" by James Arthur made up the top five. Singles by Psy, Nicki Minaj, Jessie J, Maroon 5 featuring Wiz Khalifa and Flo Rida featuring Sia were also in the top ten best-selling singles of the year.

Top-ten singles
Key

Entries by artist

 

The following table shows artists who achieved two or more top 10 entries in 2012, including singles that reached their peak in 2011 or 2013. The figures include both main artists and featured artists, while appearances on ensemble charity records are also counted for each artist. The total number of weeks an artist spent in the top ten in 2012 is also shown.

Notes

 "Lego House", "Earthquake" and "Sexy and I Know It" re-entered the top 10 at numbers 7, 8 and 9 respectively on 7 January.
 "Levels" and "Dedication to My Ex (Miss That)" re-entered the top 10 at numbers 4 and 10 respectively on 14 January.
 "Stronger (What Doesn't Kill You)" re-entered the top 10 at number eight on 10 March.
 "Turn Me On" re-entered the top 10 at number ten on 17 March.
 "Picking Up the Pieces" re-entered the top 10 at number ten on 30 June.
 "We Are Young" re-entered the top 10 at number ten on 4 July.
 "Pound the Alarm" re-entered the top 10 at number eight on 18 August.
 The 2012 remix version of "Running Up that Hill" entered the top 10 at number six on 25 August following its usage at the 2012 Summer Olympics closing ceremony; the original version peaked at number 3 in August 1985.
 "Harder Than You Think" was originally released in 2007, but entered the top 10 after it was used by Channel 4 in their coverage of the 2012 Summer Paralympics.
 "Some Nights" re-entered the top 10 at number seven on 6 October.
 "We Are Never Ever Getting Back Together" re-entered the top 10 at number seven on 27 October.
 "Stay" and "Don't You Worry Child" re-entered the top 10 at numbers 7 and 9 respectively on 12 January 2013.
 "Candy" and "Beneath Your Beautiful" re-entered the top 10 at numbers 9 and 10 respectively on 5 January 2013.
 Figure includes song that peaked in 2011.
 Figure includes song that peaked in 2013.
 Figure includes an appearance on the Justice Collective charity single "He Ain't Heavy, He's My Brother".
 Figure includes appearance on Olly Murs' "Troublemaker".
 Figure includes appearances on Naughty Boy's "Wonder" and Labrinth's "Beneath Your Beautiful".
 Figure includes three top 10 singles with the band Lawson.
 Figure includes appearance on Rihanna's "We Found Love".
 Figure includes appearance on Jessie J's "Laserlight".
 Figure includes appearance on DJ Fresh's "Hot Right Now".
 Figure includes appearance on The Script's "Hall of Fame".
 Figure includes appearance on Pitbull's "International Love".
 Figure includes appearance on Devlin's "Watchtower".
 Figure includes appearances on Calvin Harris' "Let's Go" and Conor Maynard's "Turn Around".
 Figure includes appearance on David Guetta's "Turn Me On".
 Figure includes appearances on David Guetta's "Titanium" and "She Wolf (Falling to Pieces), and Flo Rida's "Wild Ones".
 Figure includes one top 10 single with the group Girls Aloud.
 Figure includes appearance on Calvin Harris' "We'll Be Coming Back".
 Figure includes one top 10 single with the group Florence and the Machine.
 Figure includes appearance on Calvin Harris' "Sweet Nothing".
 Released as the official single for Sport Relief.
 Released as the official single for Children in Need.
 Figure includes appearance on Far East Movement's "Live My Life".
 Figure includes appearance on Gary Barlow & The Commonwealth Band's "Sing".
 Figure includes appearances on Wiley's "Can You Hear Me (Ayayaya)" and "Heatwave".
 Figure includes appearance on Tinchy Stryder's "Bright Lights".
 Figure includes appearances on Labrinth's "Earthquake" and Rita Ora's "R.I.P.".
 Figure includes one top 10 single with the group Gym Class Heroes.
 Figure includes appearance on Stooshe's "Love Me".
 Released to support the families affected by the Hillsborough Disaster.
 Figure includes song that first charted in 2011 but peaked in 2012.

See also
2012 in British music
List of number-one singles from the 2010s (UK)

References
General

Specific

External links
2012 singles chart archive at the Official Charts Company (click on relevant week)

United Kingdom
Top 10 singles
2012